Troy Lehmann (born 25 February 1972) is a former Australian rules footballer who played with Collingwood and the Brisbane Bears in the Australian Football League (AFL) during the early 1990s.

Lehmann was picked up by Collingwood in the 1989 VFL draft, from South Australian National Football League (SANFL) club North Adelaide. He played his football mostly as a ruck-rover and kicked two goals on his AFL debut in 1991. Lehmann's 22 kicks and eight handballs in a convincing win over Adelaide at Victoria Park earned him maximum Brownlow Medal votes and he finished the year with an average of 20 disposals a game.

Hamstring problems troubled Lehmsnn during his league career and he put together just four appearances in 1993.

Before the 1994 AFL season, Lehmann was traded to Brisbane together with teammates Craig Starcevich and a draft pick used on Chris Scott. In return Collingwood gained a future captain and Brownlow Medal winner in Nathan Buckley.

References

1972 births
Collingwood Football Club players
Brisbane Bears players
North Adelaide Football Club players
Australian rules footballers from South Australia
Living people